Yadrinsky District (Yetĕrne rayonĕ) is an administrative and municipal district (raion), one of the twenty-one in the Chuvash Republic, Russia. It is located in the northwest of the republic and borders with the Mari El Republic in the north, Morgaushsky District in the east, Alikovsky and Krasnochetaysky Districts in the south, and with Nizhny Novgorod Oblast in the west. Its administrative center is the town of Yadrin. Population:  The population of Yadrin accounts for 32.1% of the district's total population.

History
The district was established on September 5, 1927 with the merger of 5 municipalities ( Leninskaya, Baldaevskaya, Malokarachkinskaya, Toraevskaya and Shumatovskaya) and the city of Yadrin. The first head of the district was Alexander Ivanovich Markov.

Government
The Mayor of the city - Andrey Vladimirovich Agakov (start 05.12.2011). The Deputy - Larisa Polikarpova.

Geography

Demography
According to the 2010 Census, Chuvash make up 84% of the district population. Other groups include Russians (15%), and a host of smaller groups.

Economics

Famous people 
 Boris Cheendykov - writer, poet, translator
 Zinovy Talantsev, businessman, politician and public figure;
 Nikolay Ashmarin, Russian and Soviet linguist, Turkologist; 
 Nikolay Mordvinov, artist.
 Alina Ivanova, athlete

References

Notes

Sources



Districts of Chuvashia